Esterio is a male Spanish given name. Notable people with the name include:
Esterio Caraballo (born 1913), Cuban baseball player
Esterio Segura Mora (born 1970), Cuban artist

See also
Esterino

Masculine given names
Spanish masculine given names